Abington is a civil parish which lies partly in County Tipperary  (in the barony of Owney and Arra) and partly in County Limerick (partly in Limerick city and partly in the baronies  of Clanwilliam and Owneybeg).

It was home for a time to the author Sheridan Le Fanu. Le Fanu stayed in the parish as a child while his father was the rector of Abington Anglican Church. 

The hamlet and townland of Abington is in the County Limerick part of the parish.

References

Civil parishes of Owney and Arra
Civil parishes of County Limerick